Emmenopterys is a genus of flowering plants in the family Rubiaceae. The genus is found in China, Burma, Thailand, and Vietnam.

Species 
 Emmenopterys henryi Oliv. - China, Vietnam
 Emmenopterys rehderi F.P.Metcalf - Burma, Thailand

References 

Rubiaceae genera
Dialypetalantheae
Taxa named by Daniel Oliver